LER or Ler may refer to:

People
 Larry LaLonde, nicknamed "Ler", guitarist of the rock band Primus
 Anthony Ler, Singaporean notorious murderer

Places
 Ler, Norway, a village in the municipality of Melhus in Trøndelag county, Norway
 Ler, South Sudan, a village in the north central part of South Sudan
 Leytonstone High Road railway station, a station in London, England
 Leinster Airport, IATA airport code "LER"

Other
 "Ler" books, a trilogy by M. A. Foster
 Label Edge Router, a term used to define an edge-most router in an IP/MPLS network
 Light-emitting resistor, the working principle of an incandescent light bulb
 Liquid epoxy resin, a precursor to coatings and flooring material
 Locus of enterocyte effacement-encoded regulator, a regulatory protein in pathogenic bacteria
 Loss Exchange Ratio, a military calculation of comparative casualties of war
 London Electric Railway, later part of the London Underground
 The Loyal Edmonton Regiment, an infantry unit of the Army Reserve Canadian Forces
 Luminous efficacy of radiation, for light sources, the ratio of luminous flux to power
 Lunar Electric Rover, a vehicle designed by NASA for extra-vehicular activity on the lunar surface.
 Elite One Championship (French: Ligue Élite de Rugby), a French rugby league
 Ler (mythology), a sea god in Irish mythology also known as Lir